Lemyra extensa is a moth of the family Erebidae. It was described by Francis Walker in 1856. It is found on Sulawesi.

References

 

extensa
Moths described in 1856